The 16th Metro Manila Film Festival was held in 1990. There are six official entries of the Festival which includes the return of Shake, Rattle & Roll film series.

MRN Film International's Andrea, Paano Ba ang Maging Isang Ina? topped the 1990 Metro Manila Film Festival with eleven awards including the Best Picture, Best Actress for Nora Aunor and Best Director for Gil Portes among others. Other awardees include Dolphy for Best Actor and his son, Vandolph Quizon won the Best Child Performer tied with the Guila Alvarez.

This year's festival also added two new categories namely Best Visual Effects and Best Make-up in which Shake, Rattle & Roll II received both of the awards. It also introduces the Gatpuno Antonio J. Villegas Cultural Awards category for the first time, received by Andrea, Paano Ba ang Maging Isang Ina?.

Entries

Winners and nominees

Current Categories
Winners are listed first and highlighted in boldface.

Special awards

Multiple awards

Ceremony Information

Gabi ng Parangal
The "Gabi ng Parangal" paid tribute to the "funny men and women of the Philippine entertainment and their important roles, especially in times of crisis".
Hosts: Bert "Tawa" Marcelo
Nanette Inventor
Tessie Tomas
Director of Proceedings: Al Quinn
Anchorman: The Mongolian, Mr. Shoo Li (a.k.a. Jun Urbano)

References

External links

Metro Manila Film Festival
MMFF
MMFF